Lake Salinas is a salt lake in the Arequipa Region in Peru. It is situated in the Arequipa Province, Tarucani District.

See also
 List of lakes in Peru
 Pichu Pichu
 Tacune

References

INEI, Compendio Estadistica 2007, page 26

Salt flats
Salinas
Salinas
Ramsar sites in Peru